Hannibal (also known as Hannibal: Rome's Worst Nightmare) is a 2006 television film, presented as a dramatised documentary, made by the BBC. It is narrated by Kenneth Cranham.

The film is chiefly centred on the Italian campaign of Hannibal, the famous Carthaginian general during the Second Punic War.

Cast
Carthaginians
 Alexander Siddig as Hannibal, supreme commander of the Carthaginian army.
 Emilio Doorgashingh as Maharbal, chief cavalry commander and second-in-command of the Carthaginian army.
 Bashar Rahal as Hasdrubal, Hannibal's younger brother and the commander of the Spanish provinces.
 Mido Hamada as Mago, Hannibal's youngest brother and the infantry commander.
 Histro Mitzkov as Gisgo, an officer in Hannibal's army who notably comments on the strength of the Roman army at Cannae. This earns Hannibal's comment that, while there are indeed a lot of Romans, none of them are called Gisgo.

Romans
 Shaun Dingwall as Scipio Africanus, the Roman general who finally defeated Hannibal.
 Tristan Gemmill as Varro, the consul defeated at Cannae.
 Ben Cross as Fabius Maximus, Dictator and author of the Fabian strategy.

References

External links
 
 Hannibal on BBC
 
 Review

2006 television films
2006 films
Second Punic War films
Cultural depictions of Hannibal
Cultural depictions of Scipio Africanus
Films shot in Bulgaria
British war drama films
British films based on actual events
Drama films based on actual events
Films set in ancient Rome
Films set in Tunisia
Films set in Spain
Films set in Italy
Television films based on actual events
War films based on actual events
War television films
2000s British films
British drama television films